Papatawa is a rural community in the Tararua District and Manawatū-Whanganui region of New Zealand's North Island. It is located six kilometres north-east of Woodville, on both sides of State Highway 2.

The area has no shops, and locals use Palmerston North, Pahiatua and Dannevirke as service centres.

History

19th century

European settlement of the area began in 1878, when an area of forest called the Victoria Block was cleared and subdivided into 36 farming sections.

The Manga-atua School house opened in the area 1887, with a roll of the 18 pupils increasing to 22 within the first day. The school changed its name to Papatawa School in 1905, and it eventually gained an extra classroom.

20th century

In 1910 John A. Millar, the Minister of Railways in the Ward Ministry, denied a request for a railway loading bank at Papatawa, citing a lack of funds.

By the 1930s, the area had a dairy factory, a railway station, a county council yard, and a team of horses in stables. The area was connected by gravel roads, two rail lines and a shunting line. Cheese from the dairy factory was transported to the railway station by horse and cart, and most locals took the train to Woodville to do shopping.

During the Great Depression, workers built a tennis court at the school and turned the school to face the sun. A pool was installed in the 1960s.

21st century

The 4.5 kilometre Papatawa stretch of State Highway 2 has been the site of several fatal crashes.

Between 2010 and 2014, the NZ Transport Agency realigned and straightened the 4.5 kilometre stretch of State Highway 2, with a new intersection, rail crossing, over-bridge, passing lane and stream diversion. The $11 million project aimed to reduce crashes and separate local traffic from the 700 trucks that were using the road between Tararua and Hawke's Bay each day.

Education

School children walked to school until the introduction of a community-run school bus. Most students are now dropped off to school, cycle or take the school bus.

As of 2020, the school has a twice-weekly breakfast club sponsored by Fonterra and Sanitarium, and students are also rostered to cook hot lunches brought from home.

History

Victor Lindauer, the son of portrait painter Gottfried Lindauer, taught at the school in the early 1920s after returning from a two-year stint in the United States. Under the influence of family friend William Colenso, he went on to become prominent in the study of algae.

In the 1940s, girls would sweep the school on Friday afternoons while boys emptied the buckets in the toilets.

The school held major anniversary celebrations in 1937 and 1987.

In 2008, the school floated the idea of a voluntary closure but faced an uproar from the local community.

In 2009, a Ministry of Education review proposed closing eight of the ten schools in the Tararua bush area, including Papatawa School. Papatawa had 18 students at the time. Principal Louise Ilton told the Dominion Post:
"The kids are really worried; we got the message last year and have no plan to close."

The school marked its 130th anniversary with a celebration dinner in June 2017.

Notable people

Anna Leese, international opera singer raised in Papatawa

References

Populated places in Manawatū-Whanganui
Tararua District